The 68th parallel south is a circle of latitude that is 68 degrees south of the Earth's equatorial plane, in the Antarctic. It crosses the Southern Ocean and Antarctica. At this latitude, the sun is visible for 24 hours, 0 minutes during the December Solstice, and Civil Twilight during the June Solstice.

Around the world
Starting at the Prime Meridian and heading eastwards, the parallel 68° south passes through:

{| class="wikitable plainrowheaders"
! scope="col" width="125" | Co-ordinates
! scope="col" | Continent or ocean
! scope="col" | Notes
|-
| style="background:#b0e0e6;" | 
! scope="row" style="background:#b0e0e6;" | Southern Ocean
| style="background:#b0e0e6;" | King Haakon VII Sea, south of the Atlantic Ocean
|-
| 
! scope="row" rowspan="2" | Antarctica
| Queen Maud Land, claimed by 
|-
| 
| Enderby Land, Kemp Land, Mac. Robertson Land, claimed by 
|-
| style="background:#b0e0e6;" | 
! scope="row" style="background:#b0e0e6;" | Southern Ocean
| style="background:#b0e0e6;" | Prydz Bay, Cooperation Sea, south of the Indian Ocean
|-
| 
! scope="row" rowspan="3"| Antarctica
| Princess Elizabeth Land, Wilhelm II Land, Queen Mary Land, Wilkes Land, claimed by 
|-
| 
| Adélie Land, claimed by 
|-
| 
| George V Land, claimed by 
|-
| style="background:#b0e0e6;" | 
! scope="row" style="background:#b0e0e6;" | Southern Ocean
| style="background:#b0e0e6;" |  South of the Pacific Ocean
|-
| 
! scope="row" | Antarctica
|-
| style="background:#b0e0e6;" | 
! scope="row" style="background:#b0e0e6;" | Southern Ocean
| style="background:#b0e0e6;" | Weddell Sea, south of the Atlantic Ocean
|}

See also
67th parallel south
69th parallel south

s68